Nolan John Kotahitanga o te Hau Tupaea is a New Zealand former professional rugby league footballer who played in the 1980s.

Playing career
Tupaea played for the St. George club and the Petone Panthers in the Wellington Rugby League competition. Tupaea played for St. George between 1970 and 1979, being part of a premiership winning side in 1977. He spent 1973-74 season playing for Wigan, although he did not play in a first grade match. In 1979 he moved to Petone, winning premierships in 1980, 1981 and 1982. He was also part of their 1982 victory in the National Club Cup.

Representative career
Tupaea represented Wellington, playing 64 matches between 1971 and 1985. He was selected for the Kiwi Colts in 1973 for a match against Queensland. In 1976 he represented the North Island against the touring Sydney Metropolitan side.

Tupaea played for the Central Districts side in their first five years of the New Zealand Rugby League's district competition. The side won the competition in 1979, 1980 and 1982.

He represented the New Zealand national rugby league team in 1980 on their tour of Great Britain and France. He didn't play a test match, but he did play in 11 games for the Kiwis, scoring three tries. In 1983 he toured Britain again, this time with the New Zealand Māori side.

Legacy

References

New Zealand rugby league players
New Zealand Māori rugby league players
New Zealand Māori rugby league team players
New Zealand national rugby league team players
Place of birth missing (living people)
Rugby league five-eighths
Wellington rugby league team players
Year of birth missing (living people)
Petone Panthers players
St. George Saints players
Central Districts rugby league team players
North Island rugby league team players
Wigan Warriors players
Living people